"Who Do You Think Of?" is a song by English recording trio M.O. It was released as a digital download on 20 May 2016 in the United Kingdom, as the first single from the band's second EP Who Do You Think Of? Influenced by dance pop and tropical house, the song was written by band members Annie Ashcroft, Frankee Connolly, and Nadine Samuels along with Ferdy Unger Hamilton, Nicholas Listrani, Ryan Sudlow, and Stephen and Fred Gibson, while production was helmed by the latter. It reached number 18 on the UK Singles Chart, becoming the group's first top 20, and 40 entry. The song was later including on the group's third EP Modus Operandi.

Music video
A music video for "Who Do You Think Of?" was directed by Charlotte Rutherford and released online alongside the song on 20 May 2016.

Track listing

Charts

Certifications

Release history

References

External links
 

2016 songs
2016 singles
M.O songs
Polydor Records singles
Tropical house songs
Songs written by Fred Again